Javaid Ali Manwa is a Pakistani politician who is member of the Gilgit Baltistan Assembly.

Political career
Manwa contested 2020 Gilgit-Baltistan Assembly election on 15 November 2020 from constituency GBA-5 (Nagar-II) as an Independent candidate. He won the election by the margin of 720 votes over the runner up Rizwan Ali of Majlis Wahdat-e-Muslimeen. He garnered 2,570 votes while Ali received 1,850 votes. After winning the election, Manwa joined Pakistan Tehreek-e-Insaf.

References

Living people
Gilgit-Baltistan MLAs 2020–2025
Politicians from Gilgit-Baltistan
Year of birth missing (living people)